Massumeh Noushin Seyhoun (née Monir Noushin; 1934–21 May, 2010) was an Iranian painter, curator, and gallerist. She was the founder (1966) of Seyhoun Gallery, Tehran, the longest-lived art gallery in Iran.

Biography 
Massumeh Seyhoun was born in 1934 in Rasht, her birth name was Monir Noushin. Later her family settled in Ahvaz. She had changed her name to Massumeh. She studied at the Faculty of Fine Arts of Tehran, where her teacher was Hooshang Seyhoun, architect, sculptor, painter, who in several years had become her husband. They had two children, a son Nader and a daughter Maryam.

When Seyhoun's health started failing in the mid-1990s, she passed control of the gallery to her son Nader. Her daughter, Maryam, opened the Seyhoun Gallery, Los Angeles, on Melrose Avenue in West Hollywood, an outpost of the Tehran gallery in the United States. The gallery exhibits Iranian expatriate artists and artists based in Iran, many of whom have worked with the Seyhoun Gallery in Tehran.

References

1934 births
2010 deaths
People from Rasht
Iranian women painters
20th-century Iranian women
21st-century Iranian women